The 1998–99 Coppa Italia was the 52nd edition of the tournament, which began on August 23, 1998 and ended on May 5, 1999. Parma won the 1998–99 Coppa Italia tournament for the 2nd time in club history and first since the 1991–92 competition. Parma defeated Fiorentina in the finals, winning on the away goals rule with an aggregate score of 3–3.

Preliminary round 

p=after penalty shoot-out

Round of 32

Round of 16 

p=after penalty shoot-out

Quarter-finals

Semi-finals

Final

First leg

Second leg

3–3 on aggregate. Parma won on away goals rule.

UEFA Cup playoff 
Dates: 27 May 1999, 2nd leg: 30 May 1999

Top goalscorers

References 
 RSSSF.com

Coppa Italia seasons
Coppa Italia, 1998-99
Coppa Italia, 1998-99